Roy William Carter (born 19 February 1954 in Torpoint) is a former professional footballer.

Carter played for Falmouth Town, and he then joined Hereford United in April 1975. He made his league debut the same season and went on to play 71 league games, scoring 9 times.

He transferred to Swindon Town for a £22,000 fee in December 1977 and he went on to make 236 senior appearances for the club, scoring 39 goals. After loan spells with Torquay United and Bristol Rovers he moved permanently to Torquay in February 1983.

He later joined Newport County and played 152 league games, scoring 21 times before moving to Exeter City. He stayed only one season at St. James' Park before leaving league football and joining Saltash United.

References

1954 births
Living people
English Football League players
Footballers from Cornwall
Falmouth Town A.F.C. players
Hereford United F.C. players
Swindon Town F.C. players
Torquay United F.C. players
Bristol Rovers F.C. players
Newport County A.F.C. players
Exeter City F.C. players
People from Torpoint
Saltash United F.C. players
Association football midfielders
English footballers